Iván Alejandro Benítez (born 31 May 1988) is a Spanish professional footballer who plays as a central defender.

Club career
Benítez was born in Las Palmas, Canary Islands. Save for one Segunda División match with UD Las Palmas he competed solely in lower league football in his country, representing UD Las Palmas Atlético, FC Barcelona B and Atlético Madrid B.

Abroad, Benítez played for Doxa Katokopias FC and Nea Salamis Famagusta FC (both in Cyprus), and Inter Baku PIK in the Azerbaijan Premier League.

Club statistics

References

External links

1988 births
Living people
Footballers from Las Palmas
Spanish footballers
Association football defenders
Segunda División players
Segunda División B players
Tercera División players
UD Las Palmas Atlético players
UD Las Palmas players
FC Barcelona Atlètic players
Atlético Madrid B players
Cypriot First Division players
Doxa Katokopias FC players
Nea Salamis Famagusta FC players
Azerbaijan Premier League players
Shamakhi FK players
Spain youth international footballers
Spanish expatriate footballers
Expatriate footballers in Cyprus
Expatriate footballers in Azerbaijan
Spanish expatriate sportspeople in Cyprus
Spanish expatriate sportspeople in Azerbaijan